Neophrida meterythralis is a species of snout moth in the genus Neophrida. It was described by George Hampson in 1916 and is known from Venezuela.

References

Moths described in 1916
Tirathabini